Pratteln railway station is a railway station in the municipality of Pratteln, in the Swiss canton of Basel-Landschaft. It is an intermediate stop on the standard gauge Bözberg and Hauenstein lines of Swiss Federal Railways.

Services 
 the following services stop at Pratteln:

 Basel trinational S-Bahn:

References

External links 
 
 

Railway stations in Basel-Landschaft
Swiss Federal Railways stations